The 1979 Avon Championships of Houston  was a women's tennis tournament played on indoor carpet courts at the Astro Arena  in Houston, Texas in the United States that was part of the 1979 Avon Championships Circuit. It was the ninth edition of the tournament and was held from January 15 through January 22, 1979. First-seeded Martina Navratilova won the singles title and earned $24,000 first-prize money.

Finals

Singles
 Martina Navratilova defeated  Virginia Wade 6–3, 6–2
 It was Navratilova's 2nd title of the year and the 26th of her career.

Doubles
 Martina Navratilova /  Janet Newberry defeated  Pam Shriver /  Betty Stöve 4–6, 6–4, 6–2

Prize money

References

External links
 Women's Tennis Association (WTA) tournament edition details
 International Tennis Federation (ITF) tournament edition details

Avon Championships of Houston
Virginia Slims of Houston
Avon Championships of Houston
Avon Championships of Houston
Avon Championships of Houston
Avon Championships of Houston